Hugh McLaughlin (13 October 1935 – 21 May 2004) was an Australian rules footballer who played with South Melbourne in the Victorian Football League (VFL) during the 1950s and 1960s.

McLaughlin was a back pocket player who made his debut for South Melbourne in 1955.  The previous year, he had trained with Footscray. He came second in South Melbourne's best and fairest award in 1962. His father, also named Hugh, also played football for South Melbourne and Footscray, and was a member of South Melbourne's 1933 Premiership team.

After retiring as a player, McLaughlin stayed at South Melbourne as a committeeman and recruiter, including being involved in the recruiting of Terry Daniher to the club in 1975.

References

External links

1935 births
2004 deaths
Australian rules footballers from Victoria (Australia)
Sydney Swans players
Australian people of Scottish descent